Dargovských hrdinov (literally: "(Borough) of the Dargov heroes") is a borough (city ward) of Košice, Slovakia, located in the Košice III district. The borough lies largely on the hillside of a local hill named Furča.

The vast majority of the Dargovských hrdinov borough consists of the local housing estates, built mainly in the form of panelhouses. There are little to no industrial structures or activities in the borough and it serves primarily as housing. The borough is also referred to collectively as Sídlisko Dargovských hrdinov ("Housing estate of the Dargov heroes") or by the popular nickname "Furča", derived from its location on the eponymous hillside.

History 
Construction of the microdistrict began in the early 1970s, with the first completed part of the borough officially opening on the 29 June 1976. Currently, there are more than 26,000 people living in the borough. The name of the housing estate and borough was chosen in honour of the combat veterans of the WWII Battle of Dargov Pass, fought over a key regional route in the Slanské Hills to the east of Košice during the winter of 1944/1945.

Statistics
 Area: 
 Population: 26,169 (31 December 2017)
 Population density: 2,400/km² (31 December 2017)
 District: Košice III
 Mayor: Jozef Andrejčák (as of 2018 elections)

Gallery

References

External links

 Official website of the Dargovských hrdinov borough
 Article on the Dargovských hrdinov borough at Cassovia.sk
 Official website of Košice

Boroughs of Košice